Tricephalous is a fictional three-headed monster appearing in American comic books published by Marvel Comics.

Publication history
Tricephalous first appeared in Fantastic Four #1 and was created by Stan Lee and Jack Kirby.

Fictional character biography
Tricephalous is an immensively-powerful three-headed creature (similar to Godzilla's King Ghidorah) that was created on Monster Island by the Deviants under the command of Kro. When Monster Island was attacked by Monster Hunters, Warlord Kro had Tricephalous attack while Kro escaped. Though much of Monster Island was destroyed, Tricephalous then became a servant of the Mole Man.

When the Fantastic Four arrived on Monster Island, Tricephalous tried to stop them. However, Tricephalous was caught off guard by their super powers and was defeated.

A Skrull named De'Lila arrived looking for the Inorganic Technodrome and took over Tricephalous and the other monsters causing them to go on a rampage. When De'Lila was defeated, Tricephalous and the other monsters returned to Monster Island with the Punisher on their trail. When the Punisher planned to destroy the entrance to Monster Island, he changed his mind when he noticed the Fantastic Four.

While Mole Man was in his castle at the time he was discussing letting Adam Warlock make his home on Monster Island, Tricephalous was shown circling Mole Man's castle.

While Pip the Troll was having a picnic on Monster Island, Tricephalous was seen scouring for food.

When Silver Surfer was visiting Adam Warlock, Tricephalpous was shown with two unnamed monsters.

To prevent the Fantastic Four from preventing him in his plan to create a pocket dimension, Aron the Rogue Watcher summoned Mole Man, Giganto, and Tricephalous to fight them. Thing defeated Tricephalous by grabbing his necks and throwing him into Super-Skrull

Mole Man later sent Tricephalous and the other monsters to attack Manhattan. The Fantastic Four halted their attack by using a Pym Particle Projector to shrink them causing them to retreat. When they returned to Mole Man's lair, Mole Man decided to call off the attack when he lost interest and considered the monsters as part of his family.

Powers and abilities
Each of Tricepalous' three heads can spew fire from its mouth. The wings on its back enable it flight.

Other versions

JLA/Avengers
Tricephalous was among the monsters who fought the Justice League in their search for the Ultimate Nullifier.

In other media
Tricephalous appears in The Super Hero Squad Show episode "And Lo... A Pilot Shall Come!", voiced by Ted Biaselli. He attacks Super Hero City alongside Megataur and Manoo. Tricephalous and the other monsters were soon assisted by Fin Fang Foom. In "When Strikes the Surfer!", Tricephalous comes to the surface and starts breathing fire all over the cold Super Hero City causing the Super Hero Squad to take action. The Super Hero Squad were able to get Hulk to punch Tricephalous into the volcano where Megataur and Fin Fang Foom are also located trying to warm themselves. When Tricephalous, Fin Fang Foom, and Megataur end up in a fight, the Super Hero Squad had to make three lava pits for them to keep warm at.

References

External links
 Tricephalous at Marvel.com
 

Characters created by Jack Kirby
Characters created by Stan Lee
Comics characters introduced in 1961
Fictional characters with fire or heat abilities
Fictional monsters
Marvel Comics characters with superhuman strength
Marvel Comics supervillains